Escorts Kubota Limited formerly Escorts Limited is an Indian multinational conglomerate that operates in the sectors of agricultural machinery, construction machinery, material handling, and railway equipment. Its headquarters are located in Faridabad, Haryana. The company was launched in 1944 and has marketing operations in more than 40 countries. Escorts manufactures tractors, automotive components, railway equipment, and construction and material handling equipment.

Escorts Kubota Limited's management team includes Nikhil Nanda as the Chairman and Managing Director and Seizi Fukuoka as Deputy Managing Director.

History 
Escorts Limited was originally founded as Escorts Agents Ltd. in 1944 by brothers Har Prasad Nanda and Yudi Nanda. They started a family owned business, Nanda Bus Company, in Lahore.

Escorts Limited was founded in 1960 after the company set up its manufacturing base at Faridabad and began manufacturing agricultural machinery, x-ray machines with Westinghouse and heating elements with Elpro.

Businesses

Escorts Agri Machinery 
Escorts Agri Machinery was launched in 1960. The company manufactures tractors under the brand names Farmtrac, Powertrac, and Steeltrac. The first Escorts tractors were produced in 1961 based on Ursus license. In 1969, a partnership with Ford was set up to produce licensed Ford tractors for India.

Escorts has a plant in Mrągowo, Poland, that was purchased from Pol-Mot in 2000, and four plants in India. There was an assembly plant in Tarboro, North Carolina, that was purchased from Long Agri, but the North American subsidiary went into receivership in 2008.

Escorts Construction Equipment

Escorts Construction Equipment manufactures and markets construction and material handling equipment like pick-and-carry cranes, backhoe loader, vibratory rollers, and forklifts. The manufacturing and assembly facility is located in Sec 58, Faridabad.

Railway Equipment Division

The Railway Equipment Division manufactures and supplies critical railway components such as air brake systems, EP brake systems, draft gears and couplers, composition brake blocks, dampers, and rubber components to the Indian Railways. The manufacturing facility is located in Sector 24, Faridabad.

Escorts Auto Products

Escorts Auto Products manufactures auto suspension products such as shock absorbers, struts, and telescopic front forks for the automotive industry. The company collaborated with Fichtel & Sachs to introduce the concept of shock absorbers to be manufactured in India in 1966. In 2016, Escorts' Auto Products business was divested to Pune-based Badve Engineering.

Motorcycles
The motorcycle division of Escorts group used to manufacture Polish SHL M11  motorcycles under the brand name Rajdoot from the early 1960s until 2005.

In the early 1980s, Escorts started making Yamaha motorcycles in India. Rajdoot 350 was launched in 1983, which was later followed by the Yamaha RX 100 in 1985. The motorcycle manufacturing unit in Faridabad, India, was sold to Yamaha in 2001 when Escorts decided to quit the motorcycle business to concentrate on tractors and auto components.

Knowledge Management Centre
The centre designs tractors. It has facilities such as an engine laboratory that has computerised test beds with online control, data acquisition, and analysis; an advanced vehicle testing laboratory; a noise vibration and harshness lab; a metrology lab; and a materials engineering lab.

References

External links
 Official website
Escorts Tractor
 Escorts rebrands to Escorts Kubota Limited

Agricultural machinery manufacturers of India
Tractor manufacturers of India
Engineering companies of India
Indian brands
Companies based in Haryana
Manufacturing companies established in 1960
1960 establishments in India
Companies listed on the National Stock Exchange of India
Companies listed on the Bombay Stock Exchange